Katoka is a commune of the city of Kananga in the Democratic Republic of the Congo.

Kananga
Communes of the Democratic Republic of the Congo